Tappeh-ye Esmail (also Romanized as Tappeh-ye Esmā‘īl) is a village in Kivanat Rural District, Kolyai District, Sonqor County, Kermanshah Province, Iran. At the 2006 census, its population was 191, in 54 families.

References 

Populated places in Sonqor County